Numb-like protein is a protein that in humans is encoded by the NUMBL gene.

Interactions
NUMBL has been shown to interact with MAP3K7IP2.

References

Further reading